Caloptilia dentata is a moth of the family Gracillariidae. It is known from China (Beijing).

The larvae feed on Acer truncatum. They mine the leaves of their host plant.

References

dentata
Moths of Asia
Moths described in 1990